Saw Pale was a Burmese royal name.

It may mean:

 Saw Pale of Pinya:  Duchess of Taungdwin
 Saw Pale of Yamethin:  Duchess of Yamethin
 Saw Pale of Nyaungyan:  Duchess of Nyaungyan

Burmese royal titles